Teto may refer to:
 Teto Kasane, a UTAU voicebank and mascot
 Teto the Clown, a clown puppet created by Hazelle Hedges Rollins
 Teto (footballer)
 Teto, a character in Nausicaä of the Valley of the Wind